General Anaya is a station on Line 2 of the Mexico City Metro system. It is located in the Coyoacán borough of Mexico City, directly south of the city centre in the median of Calzada de Tlalpan, and right next to the Estudios Churubusco. It is a surface station.

General information
The station logo shows a military officer standing next to a cannon, this due to the fact that the station is named after General Pedro María Anaya, commander of the Mexican forces during the 1847 Battle of Churubusco of the Mexican–American War. The battle happened around the small monastery of Churubusco, located not far away from the station. The monastery was later turned into the Museo Nacional de las Intervenciones and still exhibits some of the artillery used during the battle. The station opened on 1 August 1970.

Ridership

Nearby
Parque Masayoshi Ōhira, park dedicated to the friendship between Mexico and Japan.
Museo Nacional de las Intervenciones, National Museum of the Interventions.
Club Campestre de la Ciudad de México, country club.
Estudios Churubusco, movie studios.
Centro Nacional de las Artes, national center of arts, housing the national schools of film, performing arts, classic and contemporary dance, music and painting, sculpture and printmaking.

Exits
East: Calzada de Tlalpan between Corredores street and Ciclistas street, Colonia Country Club
West: Calzada de Tlalpan between 20 de agosto street and Callejón General Anaya, Colonia Churubusco

Gallery

See also 
 List of Mexico City metro stations

References

External links 

General Anaya
Railway stations opened in 1970
1970 establishments in Mexico
Mexico City Metro stations in Coyoacán
Accessible Mexico City Metro stations